A naval air station is a military air base, and consists of a permanent land-based operations locations for the military aviation division of the relevant branch of a navy (Naval aviation). These bases are typically populated by squadrons, groups or wings, their various support commands, and other tenant commands.

The term "Naval Air Station" is used by many countries' navies, such as the United States Navy, the Royal Australian Navy, the Royal Navy, and the Indian Navy.

In the case of the U.S. Navy, similar facilities in the U.S. Marine Corps are known as Marine Corps Air Stations and facilities in the U.S. Coast Guard are known as Coast Guard Air Stations.

Argentinean Navy
The Argentine Naval Aviation operates four Base Aeronaval (BAN): from BAN Punta Indio (BAPI) in Buenos Aires Province through BAN Comandante Espora (BACE) and BAN Almirante Zar (BAAZ) in Patagonia to BAN Almirante Quijada (BARD) at Tierra del Fuego. Runways also serve domestic airlines at almost all Argentine military air bases. The Navy operates Estacion Aeronaval (EAN) (stations) which have smaller crews and are not normally assigned aircraft. These include Ezeiza, Rio Gallegos and Ushuaia.

The Argentine Naval Prefecture, serving as the Coast Guard, also operates air stations at Posadas, Buenos Aires, Mar del Plata, and Comodoro Rivadavia. Aircraft operating out of these bases are heavily involved in air/sea rescues.

Royal Australian Navy

In Australia, there is one Naval Air Station, "NAS Nowra", HMAS Albatross, and the formal Naval Aircraft Repair Yard and apprentice training establishment at HMAS Nirimba in  Schofields, Sydney.

French Navy
In 2017, the French Naval Aviation has four naval air stations (BAN), all located in metropolitan territory.

Bases d'aéronautique navale
 BAN Lann-Bihoué (mainly dedicated to maritime patrol) 
 BAN Lanvéoc-Poulmic (mainly dedicated to helicopters)
 BAN Landivisiau (mainly dedicated to carrier fighters)
 BAN Hyères Le Palyvestre, (mainly dedicated to carrier fighters)

Location

In 2011, the BAN Tontouta was reassigned the French Air Force ; the BAN Nîmes-Garons is now assigned primarily to the civil aviation (air transport) and on a secondary basis to the Ministry of Interior for Civil Security.

Royal Navy

The United Kingdom has two active Royal Naval Air Stations (RNAS), RNAS Yeovilton (HMS Heron) and RNAS Culdrose (HMS Seahawk).

Until 2006, the former served as the main operating base for the Royal Navy's Sea Harriers, which were based upon the three s. However, upon the withdrawal of the BAe Sea Harrier in that year, no strike aircraft have operated from there. It is believed that all of their successors will be based at RAF Lossiemouth. The site also contains the Fleet Air Arm Museum, that showcases a variety of aircraft from the Royal Naval Air Service (1914–1918) until the present day. RNAS Yeovilton also has RNAS Merryfield as its training and satellite station.

RNAS Culdrose serves a variety of helicopter and fixed-wing squadrons, such as the Sea King and the Jetstream respectively. Among the features at RNAS Culdrose is the "Dummy deck" which is used to train pilots to land on ships, the Merlin training facility, and the Fleet Requirements Air Direction Unit. Its satellite airfield is RNAS Predannack.

Italian Navy

The Italy has three Marina Militare NAS: MARISTAELI Catania, MARISTAELI La Spezia Luni and MARISTAER Grottaglie.

United States Navy
In the United States, a "Naval Air Station" (NAS) is an air base of the United States Navy.  When located in foreign countries, they are more specifically named US Naval Air Stations (USNAS), to avoid confusion with naval air stations used by the navies of the host countries.

A slightly lower level of air base in the U.S. Navy is the Naval Air Facility.  These facilities normally support smaller numbers of naval aircraft.  Permanently based naval aircraft are usually minimal, with the principal focus being on supporting naval aircraft deployed from other installations.  Examples are NAF Atsugi, Japan; NAF Diego Garcia, British Indian Ocean Territory; NAF El Centro, California; NAF Washington at Andrews AFB, Maryland; NAF Souda Bay, Crete; NAF Misawa at the U.S. Air Force's Misawa AB in Japan; and NAF Mildenhall at the U.S. Air Force's RAF Mildenhall installation in the United Kingdom.  Base Realignment and Closure (BRAC) actions  have resulted in closure of Naval Air Facilities such as NAF Detroit at Selfridge ANGB, Michigan; NAF Lajes at the U.S. Air Force's Lajes AB facility in the Azores; NAF Kadena at the U.S. Air Force's Kadena AB, Japan; NAF Adak, Alaska; and NAF Midway northwest of Hawaii.

There are also a number of former Naval Air Stations that have been realigned as part of larger Naval Stations (NAVSTA) or redesignated to other functions in the Navy.  This includes the former NAS Norfolk, Virginia (now part of NAVSTA Norfolk), the former NAF Mayport, Florida (now part of NAVSTA Mayport), the former NAS Guantanamo Bay, Cuba (now part of Guantanamo Bay Naval Base); and the former NAS Lakehurst, New Jersey (redesignated as Naval Air Engineering Station Lakehurst).  In the case of NAS Memphis, Tennessee (redesignated as Naval Support Activity Mid-South), the airfield and flight line was turned over to local civilian authorities, while the Navy retained the remainder of the installation.

There are also larger facilities that are similar to Naval Air Stations and possess large airfield facilities, but were actually constructed as part of much larger facilities or were dedicated to research and development activities.  This includes NAVSTA Rota, Spain; the recently closed NAVSTA Roosevelt Roads, Puerto Rico; the still active Naval Air Weapons Station (NAWS) China Lake, California; and the recently closed Naval Air Warfare Center Warminster, Pennsylvania.

The Navy also operates a number of austere unmanned or minimally manned airfields known as Naval Auxiliary Landing Fields (NALF), Naval Outlying Landing Fields (NOLF), or more simply Outlying Fields (OLF).

United States Marine Corps
In the United States, a "Marine Corps Air Station" is an air base of the United States Marine Corps.  When located in foreign countries, they are often identified as US Marine Corps Air Stations (USMCAS), following their US Navy counterparts (the Marine Corps falling as a service under the Department of the Navy) as that term is used by the navies of other countries.

As part of Naval Aviation, Marine Corps Air Stations and Marine Corps Air Facilities fill a similar role as Naval Air Stations and Naval Air Facilities for the United States Marine Corps.  Marine aviation units are also assigned on occasion as permanently based units to Naval Air Stations, Naval Air Facilities and, in rare cases, to Air Force Bases and Air National Guard Bases as well.

Like the Navy, the Marine Corps also operates a number of austere unmanned or minimally manned airfields known as Marine Corps Auxiliary Landing Fields (MCALF), Marine Corps Outlying Landing Fields (MCOLF), or more simply Outlying Fields (OLF).  Since the Marines' flight training is combined with the Navy and the Coast Guard, those fields dedicated to training of student aviators in the southeastern United States remain under Navy control.  As a result, the Marine Corps' auxiliary fields support operational Fleet Marine Force (FMF) units for readiness purposes, such as field carrier landing practice (FCLP) for fixed-wing and rotary-wing aircraft embarking on aircraft carriers or amphibious assault ships.

United States Coast Guard
The United States Coast Guard is also part of U.S. Naval Aviation and operates its own Coast Guard Air Stations and Coast Guard Air Facilities, either as stand alone installations on joint civil-military airports or Coast Guard-controlled facilities, or collocated at Naval Air Stations, Air Force Bases, Air National Guard Bases and Army Air Fields.  Since the Coast Guard has no aviation facilities located in foreign countries, the service tends not use the term "U.S. Coast Guard Air Station" (USCGAS), but will use the term Coast Guard Air Station (CGAS) or more simply, "AIRSTA."  The Coast Guard also operates a number of smaller Coast Guard Air Facilities, most of which are limited to rotary-wing operations only and support a limited number of aircraft and personnel.

See also
Lists of military installations
Naval air squadron (also abbreviated NAS)
NAWS, Naval Air Weapons Station China Lake, California, United States

References